Pope Gregory XIII (r. 1572–1585) created 34 cardinals in eight consistories.

June 2, 1572

 Filippo Boncompagni

July 5, 1574

 Filippo Guastavillani

November 19, 1576 

 Andrew of Austria

March 3, 1577

 Albert of Austria

February 21, 1578

 Alessandro Riario
 Claude de La Baume
 Louis of Guise
 Gerard van Groesbeeck
 Pedro de Deza
 Fernando de Toledo Oropesa
 René de Birague
 Charles de Lorraine de Vaudémont
 Giovanni Vincenzo Gonzaga

December 15, 1578

 Gaspar de Quiroga y Vela

December 12, 1583

 Giovanni Antonio Facchinetti de Nuce
 Giambattista Castagna
 Alessandro Ottaviano de' Medici
 Rodrigo de Castro Osorio
 François de Joyeuse
 Michele Della Torre
 Giulio Canani
 Niccolò Sfondrati
 Anton Maria Salviati
 Agostino Valier
 Vincenzo Lauro
 Filippo Spinola
 Alberto Bolognetti
 Jerzy Radziwiłł
 Matthieu Cointerel
 Simeone Tagliavia d'Aragonia
 Scipione Lancelotti
 Charles II de Bourbon-Vendôme
 Francesco Sforza

July 4, 1584

 Andrew Báthory

References

Gregory XIII
College of Cardinals
16th-century Catholicism
 
Pope Gregory XIII